The list of WCW  World Heavyweight Champions is a chronological list of wrestlers that have held the WCW World Heavyweight Championship by ring name.

The WCW World Heavyweight Championship was a professional wrestling world heavyweight championship and its lineage began when Ted Turner purchased Jim Crockett Promotions (JCP), which used the National Wrestling Alliance (NWA) alliance name. Turner's organization was renamed World Championship Wrestling (WCW) and split from the NWA in 1991.

The WCW World Heavyweight Championship is the original world title of WCW and it remained as such until March 2001, when WCW was purchased by the World Wrestling Federation (WWF, now known as WWE) and the championship was defended as the WCW Championship as part of the Invasion storyline, with the WCW initials being dropped from the title's name in November 2001. In December 2001, the renamed World Championship was unified with the WWF Championship to create the Undisputed WWF Championship.

The championship was generally contested in professional wrestling matches, in which participants execute scripted finishes rather than contend in direct competition. There have been a total of 22 recognized champions who have had a combined 62 official reigns, with Ric Flair holding the most at eight (but WWE does not recognize the title being vacated after the 1994 Spring Stampede match, although WCW did recognize this). At 51, Flair was also the oldest champion when he won it in May 2000, while The Giant was the youngest when he won it in October 1995 at 23. The longest reigning champion was Hulk Hogan, who held the title for 469 days, which is the only reign to exceed one year (365 days). The shortest reigning champion was Chris Jericho, who held the title for approximately 13 and a half minutes, since he unified the title with the WWF Championship at Vengeance.

Reigns

Names

Reigns

Combined reigns

See also 
 List of NWA World Heavyweight Champions
 List of WWE Champions
 List of World Heavyweight Champions (WWE)
 List of former championships in WWE
 World championships in WWE

Notes

References

External links 
 Official WCW World Heavyweight Championship History
 Wrestling-Titles.com: WCW World Heavyweight Title History

World Championship Wrestling champions
WWE champions
World Championship Wrestling champions lists